The Korean War (25 June 1950 – 27 July 1953) was significant in the fact that it was the first war in which the newly independent United States Air Force was involved.

It was the first time U.S. jet aircraft entered into battle. Designed as a direct response to the Soviet MiG-15, the F-86 Sabre jets effectively countered these aircraft, tactics, and, on some occasions, pilots of the Soviet 64th Fighter Aviation Corps. World War II-era prop-driven P-51D Mustangs were pressed into the ground-air support role, and large formations of B-29 Superfortress bombers flew for the last time on strategic bombardment missions. The Korean War also saw the first large-scale use of rotary-wing helicopters.

The US suffered 4,055 service personnel killed and 2,714 aircraft lost with the USAF suffering 1,841 battle casualties, of which 1,180 were killed in action.

Overview
Shaped in World War II by an increasing concentration on the strategic role of attacking an enemy's homeland, the Air Force now faced a conflict almost entirely tactical in character and limited as to how and where airpower could be applied.

The Far East Air Forces Fifth Air Force was the command and control organization for USAF forces engaged in combat. Its units were located in Korea and Japan. Fighter and troop carrier wings from Tactical Air Command and federalized Air National Guard units from the United States deployed to the Far East and reinforced FEAF units engaged in combat. These tactical units conducted interdiction strikes on supply lines, attacked dams that irrigated North Korea's rice crops and flew missions in close support of United Nations ground forces. AT-6 Mosquitoes, trainers used as airborne controllers, provided communication links between ground troops and supporting aircraft.

Although President Truman wasn't willing to risk extensive use of the U.S. bomber force, which was being used as a deterrent for possible Soviet aggression in Europe, a few groups of Strategic Air Command aging B-29 Superfortress bombers that were not part of the nuclear strike force were released for combat over the skies of Korea. Many of these B-29s were war-weary and brought out of five years of storage. These bombers were employed effectively against North Korean military installations, government centers and transportation networks.

As with the rest of the American armed forces, the Air Force was not well prepared for battle at the western rim of the Pacific. Yet despite these limitations, the Air Force responded quickly and effectively, proving in many ways the utility of airpower in modern war. With virtually no warning, the Air Force commenced operations within the first week. It transported troops and equipment from Japan to Korea, evacuated American nationals, provided significant intelligence through aerial reconnaissance, and most importantly helped to slow the North Korean advance so that the United Nations forces could construct a defensive position on the peninsula.

Effects
The Korean War signalled the end of widespread use of prop-driven combat aircraft by the active-duty USAF and signalled the primacy of jet-powered aircraft. All F-82 Twin Mustangs had been removed from the theater by 1952 and F-51D Mustang strength had been cut in Korea from 190 to 65. First generation straight-winged F-80C Shooting Star and F-84E/G Thunderjet jet aircraft were shown inadequate against the Soviet MiG-15s. However, the swept-wing F-86 Sabre proved more effective, bringing a new generation of swept-wing aircraft into the USAF arsenal in the 1950s.

However prop-driven aircraft continued in the specialized role of counterinsurgency aircraft (A-1 Skyraider, A-26A Invader) by the 56th Special Operations Wing which were flown over Laos during the Vietnam War. (The F-51D/H Mustang was used by some ANG units in the Air Defense role, but by 1957 it was out of the inventory).

With the end of fighting in Korea, President Eisenhower, who had taken office in January 1953, called for a "new look" at national defense. The result: a greater reliance on nuclear weapons and air power to deter war. His administration invested in the Air Force, especially Strategic Air Command. The nuclear arms race became of signal importance. The Air Force retired nearly all of its propeller-driven B-29/B-50s and they were replaced by new Boeing B-47 Stratojet aircraft. By 1955 the Boeing B-52 Stratofortress would be entering the inventory in substantial numbers, as the prop-driven B-36s were quickly phased out of heavy bombardment units.

Organization
During World War II, The Group, each with three or four flying squadrons, was the basic combat element of the Army Air Forces. This organization changed in 1947 when the new United States Air Forces adopted the wing-base plan. Each combat group then active received a controlling parent wing of the same number and nomenclature. The new wing also controlled three additional groups with the same number to operate the airbase, maintain the aircraft and provide medical care at the base. When combat forces began to fight the war in Korea, the USAF units did so in various organizational forms. In some cases, the combat arm of the wing plus a portion of the wing's supporting personnel deployed to the Korean theater, leaving the rest of the wing to operate the home base, to which the group returned after its tour of combat ended.

Early in the war, some combat group deployed and operated under other wings, including temporary four-digit wings. In December 1950, those groups' aligned (same number) parent wing moved on paper from their previous bases and replaced the temporary wing in combat. The personnel of the temporary wing's headquarters were reassigned to the headquarters of its replacement.

In 1951, the Strategic Air Command began to eliminate its combat group by reducing the group headquarters token strength and attaching the flying squadrons directly to the wing; therefore, wings replaced the medium bombardment groups attached to Far East Air Forces (FEAF) Bomber Command for combat. The groups were either inactivated or reduced in strength to one officer and one enlisted.

In most case, the personnel assigned to the group headquarters were simply reassigned to the wing headquarters which had moved on paper to the location of the headquarters. Most other combat organization in-theater continued to operate with both wing and group headquarters or with group headquarters only. In a few cases, individual squadron, such as the 319th Fighter-Interceptor Squadron, were directly controlled by an organization higher than either wing or group level.

Aircraft of the Korean War

Fighters

Types employed

 North American F-51D MustangF-51Ds, though obsolete as fighters, were better suited to the small airstrips of Korea than were the F-80s and F-82s based in Japan. Japan-based F-51Ds were immediately transferred to Korea and pressed into service in an attempt to halt the rapid North Korean advance. They carried out the majority of air support missions in the early days of the war, extant jet aircraft lacking the endurance to permit sufficient loiter time over the target. Although their primary mission was close support, USAF Mustangs did engage and shoot down several North Korean Yaks when these aircraft made their infrequent appearances. In instances where Mustangs were engaged by Chinese-piloted MiG-15 jet fighters, however, they were outmatched. Mustangs were however still able to perform well in the ground-attack role and substantial number were fitted with rockets and bombs. The Mustangs were instrumental in halting the North Korean advance, buying valuable time for United Nations forces to deploy. RF-51s were used for reconnaissance.
 Lockheed F-80C Shooting StarThe Shooting Star was operated extensively in Korea with the F-80C being instrumental in quickly gaining and maintaining air superiority over the Korean battlefield. The first jet versus jet aircraft battle took place on 8 November 1950 in which an F-80 shot down a MiG-15. However, the straight-wing F-80s were inferior in performance to the MiGs and were soon replaced in the air superiority role by the swept-wing F-86 Sabre. When sufficient Sabres were in operation, the Shooting Star was assigned to ground attack missions, primarily for low-level rocket, bomb, and napalm attacks on fixed targets. The Shooting Stars were superseded by later types as the Korean War proceeded. By the time of the armistice agreement of 27 July 1953, the only Shooting Stars still flying combat missions in Korea were RF-80As being used for reconnaissance.
 Lockheed F-94B StarfireBecause it carried a highly secret airborne radar system, the F-94s were at first not permitted to fly deep into enemy territory. However the F-94 radar proved ineffective on night missions against MiGs. Mounting losses of B-29 bombers following the Chinese and North Korean development of night interception tactics finally led to the lifting of this restriction in January 1953.

 North American F-82F/G Twin MustangBased in Japan, the F-82s were among the first USAF aircraft to operate over Korea. They were the only fighter aircraft available with the range to cover the entire Korean peninsula from bases in Japan. The first three North Korean airplanes destroyed by US forces were shot down by F-82s on 27 June 1950. However, the F-82 played a secondary role in Korea as compared with its distinguished predecessor, the single-engined F-51. The Twin Mustang saw extensive service in Korea initially for air to air and ground-attack work, but their suitability as night fighters caused them to be used mostly for defense purposes. 1951 was the last full year of F-82 operations in Korea, as a shortage of spare parts limited their operations along with them being replaced by the jet-powered F-94 Starfire. Twin Mustangs destroyed 20 enemy aircraft, four in the air and 16 on the ground during the conflict. By summer 1952, the last surviving Korean War veteran F-82s were withdrawn from combat.
 Republic F-84D/E ThunderjetThe F-84 arrived in Korea in December 1950. Initially assigned to B-29 escort duties, however, the F-84E proved too slow to match the swept-wing MiG-15, and MiGs were often able to outmanoeuvre the escort screen and make successful attacks on B-29s. F-84s were used to attack enemy airfields and other targets such as irrigation dams. The F-84 made daily attacks with bombs, rockets, and napalm on enemy railroads, bridges, supply depots, and troop concentrations. The resulting floods extensively damaging rice fields, buildings, bridges, and roads. Most importantly, 2 main rail lines were disabled for several days. While unable to cope with the MiG-15 at high altitude, they were more effective at medium or low altitudes and scored several kills. RF-84s were used for reconnaissance.
 North American F-86A/E/F SabreThe F-86 Sabre survived many initial teething problems to become the premier USAF fighter of the Korean War. By the end of hostilities, all but one pilots in the UN airfleet, who claimed the status of ace flew a model of the F-86. Later models were more powerful and used both for air-to-air and ground support. The RF-86 was used for reconnaissance.

Fighter units

 4th Fighter-Interceptor Wing (Deployed) (F-86 Sabre)
 Attached to Fifth Air Force, 28 November 1950 – 7 March 1955
 Further attached to 314th Air Division 22 December 1950 – 7 May 1951
 Further attached to 39th Air Division, 1–7 March 1955
 Stationed at: Johnson AB, Japan, 28 November 1950; Suwon AB, South Korea, 7 May 1951; Kimpo AB, South Korea, 23 August 1951 – 1 October 1954

 8th Fighter-Bomber Wing (F-80 Shooting Star, F-82 Twin Mustang, F-86 Sabre)
 Fifth Air Force, 1 March 1950 – 1 March 1955
 Attached to 6131 Fighter [later, 6131 Tactical Support] Wing, 14 August-1 December 1950
 Stationed at: Itazuke Air Field, Japan, 1 March 1950; Pyongyang, North Korea, 1 December 1950; Seoul AB, South Korea, 9 December 1950; Itazuke AB, Japan, 10 December 1950; Kimpo AB, South Korea, 25 June 1951; Suwon AB, South Korea, 23 August 1951 – 10 October 1954

 18th Fighter-Bomber Wing (F-51 Mustang, F-80 Shooting Star, F-86 Sabre)
 Thirteenth Air Force, 1 June 1950
 Attached to: Fifth Air Force, 28 July-3 August 1950
 Attached to: 6002 Fighter [later, 6002 Tactical Support] Wing, 4 August-30 November 1950
 Attached to: Fifth Air Force, 1 December 1950 – 31 October 1954
 Stationed at: Pusan AB, South Korea, 1 December 1950; Pyongyang East, North Korea, 1 December 1950; Suwon AB, South Korea, 4 December 1950; Chinhae, South Korea, 10 December 1950; Osan-ni, South Korea, 26 December 1952 – 1 November 1954

 27th Fighter-Escort Wing (Deployed) (F-84 Thunderjet)
 Attached to Far East Air Forces, 19–29 November 1950
 Attached to Fifth Air Force, 30 November 1950 – 15 July 1951
 42d Air Division, 6 August 1951
 Attached to Far East Air Forces, 6–13 October 1952
 Attached to 39th Air Division [Defense], 13 October 1952-c. 13 February 1953
 Stationed at: Taegu AB, South Korea, 5 December 1950; Itazuke AB, Japan, 31 January-2 July 1951; Bergstrom AFB, TX, 6 July 1951 – 16 June 1952. Misawa AB, Japan during 6 October 1952 – 13 February 1953

 35th Fighter-Interceptor Wing (F-51 Mustang, F-80 Shooting Star, F-82 Twin Mustang, F-94 Starfire)
 Fifth Air Force, 1 March 1950
 314th Air Division, 25 May 1951
 Japan Air Defense Force, 1 March 1952
 Fifth Air Force, 1 September 1954
 Stationed at: Yokoto AB, Japan, 1 April 1950; Johnson AB, Japan, 14 August 1950; Yongho, North Korea, 1 December 1950; Pusan AB, South Korea, c. 7 December 1950; Johnson AB, Japan, 25 May 1951 – 1 October 1954

 49th Fighter-Bomber Wing (F-51 Mustang, F-80 Shooting Star, F-84 Thunderjet)
 Fifth Air Force, 1 March 1950
 Attached to 58 Fighter-Bomber Wing, 16–31 March 1953
 Japan Air Defense Force, 1 April 1953
 Attached to Fifth Air Force, 1 April-7 November 1953
 Stationed at: Misawa AB, Japan, 18 August 1948; Taegu AB, South Korea, 1 December 1950; Tsuki AB, Japan, 26 January 1951; Taegu AB, South Korea, 24 February 1951; Kunsan AB, South Korea, 1 April 1953 – 7 November 1953

 51st Fighter-Interceptor Wing (F-80 Shooting Star, F-82 Twin Mustang, F-86 Sabre)
 Twentieth Air Force, 16 May 1949
 Attached to Fifth Air Force, 25 September 1950 – 1 August 1954
 Further attached to 8 Fighter-Bomber Wing, 25 September-12 October 1950
 Stationed at: Naha Afld (later, AB), Okinawa, 18 August 1948; Itazuke AB, Japan, 22 September 1950; Kimpo AB, South Korea, 10 October 1950; Itazuke AB, Japan, 10 December 1950; Tsuiki AB, Japan, 15 January 1951; Suwon AB, South Korea, 1 October 1951 – 26 July 1954

 58th Fighter-Bomber Wing (Deployed) (F-84 Thunderjet)
 Tactical Air Command, 10 July 1952
 Attached to Fifth Air Force, 10 July 1952 – 28 February 1955
 Stationed at: Itazuke AB, Japan, 10 July 1952; Taegu AB, South Korea, August 1952– 15 March 1955

 116th Fighter-Bomber Wing (Deployed) (F-84 Thunderjet)
 Federalized Georgia Air National Guard
 Assigned to Tactical Air Command, October 1950
 Attached to Far East Air Forces, July 1951
 Further Attached to Fifth Air Force, July 1951 – 10 July 1952
 Released from Active Service 10 July 1952
 Stationed at: Itazuke AB, Japan

 136th Fighter-Bomber Wing (Deployed) (F-84 Thunderjet)
 Federalized Texas Air National Guard
 Consisted of:
 111th Fighter-Bomber Squadron (Ellington Field, Houston)
 182nd Fighter-Bomber Squadron (Brooks Air Force Base)
 154th Fighter-Bomber Squadron (Little Rock Airport)
 Assigned to Tactical Air Command 27 June 1950
 Attached to Far East Air Forces, 1951
 Further Attached to Fifth Air Force, July 1951 – 10 July 1952
 Released from Active Service 1952
 Stationed at: Itazuke AB, Japan

 474th Fighter-Bomber Wing (Deployed) (F-84 Thunderjet)
 Activated 10 July 1952, assigned to Tactical Air Command
 Attached to Far East Air Forces,
 Further Attached to Fifth Air Force, August 1952 – November 1954
 Stationed at: Misawa, Japan, 10 July 1952; Kunsan, Korea, 10 July 1952; Taegu, Korea, 1 April 1953 – 22 November 1954

 319th Fighter-Interceptor Squadron (Deployed) (F-94 Starfire)
 Assigned to Strategic Air Command, 90th Bombardment Wing
 Attached to Far East Air Forces,
 Further Attached to Fifth Air Force, February 1952 – June 1953
 Stationed at: Suwon AB, South Korea, (March 1952 – June 1953)

Source for unit history:

Bombers

Types employed

 Boeing B-29 SuperfortressBy 1950, the B-29s had been reclassified as "medium" bombers, their long-range strategic mission having been taken over by the B-36 and B-50. Many aircraft were retrieved from postwar storage and refurbished. At least 16 B-29s were shot down over North Korea, and as many as 48 were lost in crash landings or written off because of heavy damage after returning to base. When the Korean War ended on 27 July 1953, the B-29s had flown over 21,000 sorties, nearly 167,000 tons of bombs had been dropped, and 34 B-29s had been lost in combat (16 to fighters, four to flak, and fourteen to other causes). B-29 gunners had accounted for 34 Communist fighters (16 of these being MiG-15s) probably destroyed another 17 (all MiG-15s) and damaged 11 (all MiG-15s). Losses were less than 1 per 1000 sorties. The bombers were also used as reconnaissance (RB-29), weather (WB-29), and rescue aircraft (SB-29).

 Douglas B-26B/C InvaderWhen the North Korean army invaded the South on 25 June 1950, the USAF was critically short of light bombers. The B-26 Invaders in Japan proved to be invaluable in the night interdiction role, and it fell to the B-26 to fly the first and the last bombing missions of the Korean War. Their first mission was on 28 June 1950 when they attacked railroads supplying enemy forces. Their first attack against North Korea was on 29 June, when they bombed Pyongyang Air Base, the main airfield in Pyongyang. The Invaders flew some 60,000 sorties and were credited with the destruction of 38,500 vehicles, 3,700 railway cars, and 406 locomotives. The B-26 had the honor of flying the last combat sortie of the Korean War, when, 24 minutes before the Armistice Agreement went into effect on 27 July 1953 a B-26 of the 3rd BW dropped the last bombs of the Korean war. The bombers were also used for reconnaissance, as RB-26s.

Bombardment units
Far East Air Forces (FEAF)
 Far East Air Force Bomber Command
 Twentieth Air Force
 Kadena Air Base, Okinawa
 19th Bombardment Group (B-29) (June 1950 – May 1954)
 28th Bombardment Squadron
 30th Bombardment Squadron
 93d Bombardment Squadron
 Inactivated 19th BW assigned to SAC, June 1954

Strategic Air Command (SAC)
 Attached to: Far East Air Force Bomber Command

 Kadena Air Base, Okinawa
 22d Bombardment Group (B-29), (Jul–October 1950)
 2d Bombardment Squadron
 19th Bombardment Squadron
 33d Bombardment Squadron
 307th Bombardment Group (B-29), (August 1950 – November 1954)
 370th Bombardment Squadron
 371st Bombardment Squadron
 372d Bombardment Squadron

 Yokota Air Base, Japan
 92d Bombardment Group (B-29), (July–October 1950)
 325th Bombardment Squadron
 326th Bombardment Squadron
 327th Bombardment Squadron
 98th Bombardment Group (B-29), (August 1950 – July 1954)
 342d Bombardment Squadron
 343d Bombardment Squadron
 344th Bombardment Squadron
 345th Bombardment Squadron

Fifth Air Force
 3d Bombardment Wing (B-26 Invader) 1 March 1950 – 1 March 1955
 Stationed at: Johnson AB, Japan, 1 April 1950; Yokota AB, Japan, 14 August 1950; Iwakuni AB, Japan, 1 December 1950; Kunsan AB, South Korea, 22 August 1951 – 1 October 1954
 17th Bombardment Wing (B-26 Invader) 10 May 1952 – 16 March 1955
 Stationed at: Pusan-East AB, South Korea, 10 May 1952 – 10 October 1954
 452d Bombardment Wing (B-26 Invader) 15 November 1950 – 10 May 1952
 Attached to: 8 Fighter-Bomber Wing, 15–30 November 1950
 Attached to: 314th Air Division, 1 December 1950 – 10 May 1952
 Stationed at: Itazuke AB, Japan, 26 October 1950; Miho AB, Japan, c. 10 December 1950 ;Pusan-East AB, South Korea, 23 May 1951 – 10 May 1952

Source for unit history:

Reconnaissance

Types employed

 RF-51D MustangThe RF-51D was the photo-reconnaissance version of the P-51D, known as the F-6A in World War II. During the advance and later the retreat of U.N. forces into and out of North Korea that fall and winter of 1950, the RF-51 performed many deep penetrations for armed reconnaissance far north of the battle zone into what would become known as "MiG Alley." They were among the first Mustangs to be hunted by MiG-15s; it was only the fact that the unit pilots were experienced Second World War combat veterans that they were able to avoid losses in those combats. The Air Force began exchanging their RF-51Ds for RF-80As in the fall of 1952. By the end of the Korean War all had been taken out of the inventory.
 RF-80A Shooting Star66 production P-80A fighters were converted by Lockheed into reconnaissance aircraft and given the designation RF-80A-15-LO. The RF-80A proved itself in combat during the Korean War and took part in numerous sorties over North Korea as well as sorties along the border with North Korea and China, near the Yalu River.
 RF-86A/F SabreIn 1953, several F-86Fs were fitted a suite of photo-reconnaissance cameras at the Tsuiki REMCO facility in Japan, in a project code-named *Haymaker*. All armament, radars, and gunsights were removed, and a camera suite fitted. In spite of the success of the RF-86 in combat, the USAF opted for the Republic RF-84F Thunderflash as its next-generation tactical reconnaissance aircraft.
 Boeing RB/SB-17G Flying FortressThe Boeing B-17 was adapted for photographic mapping by having its bombing equipment deleted and replaced by photographic equipment. Some cameras were installed in the nose and in the aft fuselage as well. The RB-17G was operated in the Korean theater by the 6204th Photo Mapping Flight for three months in 1950 before being replaced. The 3rd Air Rescue Group used the SB-17G which was a B-17 modified to carry a lifeboat under the fuselage for air/sea rescue. SB-17s operating in Korean waters were refitted with cheek, waist, and tail guns for defensive purposes.

 RB-29 SuperfortressNearly 120 B-29s were converted to the reconnaissance configuration and redesignated as RB-29s. The RB-29s were assigned to the 91st Strategic Reconnaissance Squadron, which like other SAC units played a crucial role during the Korean War.
 Boeing RB-50A SuperfortressIn November 1950, MiG-15s jumped a flak-damaged 91st SRS RB-29 near the Yalu river. In the ensuing aerial battle, the RB-29 rear gunner shot down one of the MiGs – the first MiG-15 shot down by a B-29 gunner. The RB-29 limped back to Johnson AB, Japan and five crewmen were killed when it crashed during landing. The immediate answer to the vulnerabilities of the RB-29's was the modified RB-50A, being an uprated version of the B-29. The RB-50As operated out of Yokota AB, Japan, and was assigned to USAF's 91st Strategic Reconnaissance Squadron.
 North American RB-45C TornadoThe Tornado was the first USAF four-jet bomber, and although the B-45 was available for combat in Korea, it was the RB-45 reconnaissance version that was used. First flown in April 1950, the Tornados managed to outrun and outmaneuver MiG's on numerous occasions, however they too eventually became targets. Many of these early missions were escorted by fighter aircraft and an eventual shift was made to night operations. The RB-45 operated out of Yokota AB Japan with the 91st Strategic Reconnaissance Squadron along with the 67th Tactical Reconnaissance Wing in Korea.
 Convair RB-36D PeacemakerThe Peacemaker was used for strategic reconnaissance. In late 1952, six RB-36's were sent to Yokota Air Base, Japan with the 91st Strategic Reconnaissance Squadron to fly high altitude reconnaissance over Manchuria. In addition to bomb damage assessment, targeting and aerial photography for Far East Air Forces, the 91st conducted ELINT (Electronic Signals Intelligence) and "ferret" missions to probe Soviet air defenses in theater and give an indication of just where the holes were in Soviet radar coverage. The 91st SRS conducted the first ferret missions ever conducted by the USAF.

Reconnaissance units

 543d Tactical Support Group (RB-26 Invader, RF-80A Shooting Star, RF-51D Mustang)
 Fifth Air Force
 Temporary Wartime Unit Consisted of:
 8th Tactical Reconnaissance Squadron, Photographic
 45th Tactical Reconnaissance Squadron
 162nd Tactical Reconnaissance Squadron, Night Photographic
 6166th Air Weather Reconnaissance Flight
 Stationed at: Itazuke AB, Japan, September – October 1950; Taegu AB, South Korea (K-37), October 1950 – January 1951; Komaki AB, Japan,  – 25 January February 1951
 Unit inactivated 25 February 1951 – replaced by 67th Tactical Reconnaissance Wing

 67th Tactical Reconnaissance Wing (RB-26 Invader, RF-80A Shooting Star, RF-51D Mustang, RF-86A/F Sabre)
 Fifth Air Force, 25 February 1951 – 6 December 1954
 Stationed at: Komaki AB, Japan February–March 1951; Taegu AB, South Korea March–August 1951; Kimpo AB, South Korea August 1951 – December 1954

 31st Strategic Reconnaissance Squadron (RB-29 Superfortress)
 Far East Air Forces 29 June – 15 November 1950,
 Reassigned to Japan from Kadena AB, Okinawa
 Stationed at: Johnson AB, Japan 29 June – 15 November 1950
 Unit reassigned to 5th Strategic Reconnaissance Wing, Beale AFB, California. Replaced by 91st Strategic Reconnaissance Squadron

 91st Strategic Reconnaissance Squadron (RB-29/RB-50 Superfortress, RB-45 Tornado, WB-26 Invader, KB-29 Superfortress (Tanker) and RB-36 Peacekeeper)
 Far East Air Forces 15 November 1950 – 1954
 Activated in Japan
 Stationed at: Johnson AB, Japan November 1950, Yokota AB, Japan November 1950 – 1954

 512th Reconnaissance Squadron (RB/WB–29 Superfortress)
 Far East Air Forces 27 January 1950 – 20 February 1951
 Performed weather reconnaissance
 Stationed at: Yokota AB, Japan, 27 January 1950; Misawa AB, Japan, 11 August 1950 – 20 February 1951.
 Replaced by 56th Strategic Reconnaissance Squadron

 56th Strategic Reconnaissance Squadron (RB/WB–29 Superfortress)
 Far East Air Forces 20 February 1951 – June 1952
 Performed weather reconnaissance
 Stationed at: Misawa AB, Japan, 20 February–September 1951; Yokota AB, Japan, September 1951 – June 1952

 6204th Photo Mapping Flight Detachment 1 (RB-17G Flying Fortress)
 Far East Air Forces
 Stationed at: Johnson AB, Japan July – November 1950

Source for unit history:

Transport

Types employed

 Douglas C-47/C-53 SkytrainOfficially known as Skytrain but affectionately referred to as "Gooney Bird," the C-47 served in Korea as it had during World War II. During the Korean War, the C-47s hauled supplies, dropped paratroopers, evacuated the wounded, and pumped out flares to light the way for night bombing attacks.
 Fairchild C-119 Flying BoxcarThe C-119 Flying Boxcar (officially called C-119 Packet) was used extensively in the Korean War. Despite logistics problems that kept monthly flying time averages low, the C-119 worked well in Korea, In addition to airlifting supplies, the C-119s performed other tasks. For example, during Operation SNOWBALL in the fall of 1951, the 315th Air Division used the aircraft to drop napalm-filled 55-gallon drums on enemy troops. The C-119's greatest feat during the Korean War, however, was a mission to aid the retreat of United States Marine Corps and Army troops from Chosin in December 1950. Air Force C-119 "Flying Boxcars" dropped supplies to the US Marines, but on 7 and 8 December the Chinese closed the sack by blowing the bridge across an otherwise impassible -wide gorge south of Koto-ri. Without help, the Marines would be forced to leave behind their heavy equipment and make it out on foot, a trek many of the wounded and frostbitten would not survive. Air Force C-119s again answered the call and dropped eight two-ton spans of a treadway bridge for Marine engineers, who kept the column moving by bridging the gap under intense fire.
 Douglas C-54 SkymasterA C-54 was the first USAF aircraft destroyed in the Korean War; one of the transports on the ground at Kimpo Airfield was strafed by North Korean aircraft on 25 June 1950. It was a Military Air Transport Service workhorse throughout the war.

 Curtiss C-46 CommandoThe World War II C-46 saw additional service during the Korean War being designed to carry troops or equipment and filled an airlift role in Korea, supplying everything from aircraft engines, ammunition, medical supplies, rations, and fresh fruit. The outbreak of the Korean War caught the US unprepared and scrambling for resources. C-46s were pulled out of mothballs or even bought back from commercial operators, and put into round-the-clock use with the USAF Combat Cargo Command. The C-46 was also used to spray insecticide over some parts of South Korea and to drop psychological warfare leaflets over North Korea.
 Douglas C-124 Globemaster IIPerformed heavy lift cargo operations to and from Korea. On 27 September 1951, a C-124A began FEAF-hosted service tests labeled Operation PELICAN. In a little over one month, the aircraft flew 26 missions between Japan and Korea, carrying an average load of 34,000 pounds, double the amount carried on the C-54. In one mission in 1951, a C-124 airlifted a record 167 patients from Pusan in South Korea. Unfortunately, because of the weight of the aircraft, it was limited to only four airstrips in Korea. A heavy-duty runway was constructed at Seoul Municipal Airport in October 1952, but logistical difficulties kept the C-124 from fulfilling its airlift potential. C-124s were used by the 374th Troop Carrier Wing and the 801st Medical Air Evacuation Squadron .

Transport units

 1st Troop Carrier Group (Provisional) (C-46 Commando, C-47 Skytrain)
 Temporary unit assembled from
 46th Troop Carrier Squadron (P)
 47th Troop Carrier Squadron (P)
 48th Troop Carrier Squadron (P)
 Stationed at: Ashiya AB, Japan, August 1950 – January 1951

 61st Troop Carrier Group, Heavy (C-54 Skymaster)
 Far East Air Force Combat Cargo Command, Provisional, 10 December 1950 – 1 January 1951)
 1705 Air Transport Wing, 1 January 1951
 Attached to: Far East Air Forces Combat Cargo Command, Provisional, 1–25 January 1951
 Attached to: 315th Air Division, 25 January-1 October 1951
 Eighteenth Air Force, 1 October 1951
 Attached to: 315th Air Division, 1 October-5 November 1951
 Attached to: 6122 Air Base Wing, 5 November 1951 – 26 March 1952
 Attached to: 374th Troop Carrier Wing, 26 March-21 November 1952
 Stationed at: Ashiya AB, Japan, 10 December 1950; Tachikawa AB, Japan, 26 March-15 November 1952

 314th Troop Carrier Group, Medium (C-82/C-119 Flying Boxcar)
 Attached to: Far East Air Forces [FEAF], 7–9 September 1950
 Attached to: FEAF Combat Cargo Command, 10 September-30 November 1950
 Attached to: 314th Air Division, 1 December 1950 – 25 January 1951
 Attached to: 315th Air Division [Combat Cargo], 25 January 1951-c. 1 November 1952
 Attached to: 483rd Troop Carrier Wing, 1 January 1953 – 15 November 1954.
 Stationed at: Ashiya AB, Japan, 7 September 1950 – 15 November 1954

 315th Troop Carrier Wing, Medium (C-46 Commando)
 315th Air Division, 10 June 1952 – 18 January 1955.
 Stationed at: Brady AB, Japan, 10 June 1952 – 18 January 1955

 374th Troop Carrier Wing, Heavy (C-54 Skymaster)
 Fifth Air Force, 5 March 1949
 Attached to: 1 Troop Carrier Task Force [Provisional], 5–9 September 1950
 Attached to: Far East Air Forces Combat Cargo Command, Provisional, 10 September 1950 – 1 December 1950
 314th Air Division, 1 December 1950
 Remained attached to Far East Air Forces Combat Cargo Command, Provisional, to 25 January 1951
 315th Air Division (Combat Cargo), 25 January 1951 – 1 July 1957.
 Stationed at: Tachikawa (later, Tachikawa AB), Japan, 5 March 1949 – 1 July 1957

 403d Troop Carrier Wing, Medium (C-54 Skymaster, C-46 Commando)
 Eighteenth Air Force, 1 June 1951 – 1 January 1953
 Attached to 315th Air Division, 14 April 1952 – 1 January 1953
 Stationed at: Ashiya AB, Japan, 14 April 1952 – 1 January 1953

 1503rd Air Transport Wing, Heavy (C-118A Liftmaster)
 Military Air Transport Service, June 1948
 Stationed at: Haneda AB, Japan, 1946 – 1964

 437th Troop Carrier Wing, Medium (C-46 Commando)
 Fifth Air Force, 8 November 1950
 Attached to FEAF Combat Cargo Command, Provisional, 8 November 1950 – 1 December 1950
 314th Air Division, 1 December 1950
 Remained attached to FEAF Combat Cargo Command, Provisional, through 24 January 1951
 315th Air Division (Combat Cargo), 25 January 1951 – 10 June 1952
 Stationed at: Brady Field, Japan, 8 November 1950 – 10 June 1952

 483d Troop Carrier Wing, Medium (C-119 Flying Boxcar)
 Tactical Air Command, 1 January 1953
 Attached to 315th Air Division (Combat Cargo), 1 January 1953 – 30 June 1954
 Stationed at: Ashiya AB, Japan, 1 January 1953 – 30 June 1954

Source for unit history:

Tactical air control units

 North American AT-6 TexanThe Texan trainer found a new life in Korea as a forward air control aircraft. To meet an urgent operational need for close air support of ground forces, the Texans flew "mosquito" missions, spotting enemy troops and guns and marking them with smoke rockets for USAF fighter attack. The T-6s of the 6147th Tactical Control Group performed invaluable work.

Units that flew the AT-6 in Korea were:

 502nd Tactical Control Group
 Temporary unit composed of:
 605th Tactical Control Squadron: duration.
 606th Aircraft Control and Warning Squadron: duration.
 607th Aircraft Control and Warning Squadron: duration.
 608th Aircraft Control and Warning Squadron: 2 November 1951–.
 6132d Aircraft Control and Warning Squadron: 9 October 1950 – 2 November 1951.
 1st Shoran Beacon Unit (later, Squadron): attached 27 September – 1 December 1950 and 6 September 1952–.
 Stationed at: Pusan, South Korea, September – October 1950; Taegu, South Korea, October 1950; Seoul, South Korea, October 1950 – July 1953

 6147th Tactical Control Group
 Temporary unit composed of:
 942nd Forward Air Control Squadron
 6148th Tactical Control Squadron
 6149th Tactical Control Squadron
 6150th Tactical Control Squadron
 Stationed at: Taegu AB, South Korea, August – October 1950; Kimpo AB, South Korea October 1950; Seoul Afld, South Korea, October 1950; Pyongyang East Adrm, North Korea, October – November 1950; Taegu AB, South Korea, November 1950 – March 1951; Pyongtaek Adrm, South Korea, March 1951 – April 1952; Chunchon, South Korea, April 1952 – July 1953

Source for unit history:

Other units

 3rd Air Rescue Group
 1st Shoran Beacon Squadron
 5th Communications Group
 10th Liaison Squadron
 20th Weather Squadron Detachments
 30th Weather Squadron
 75th Air Depot Wing

 417th Engineer Aviation Brigade
 581st Air Resupply and Communications Wing
 801st Medical Air Evacuation Squadron
 3903rd Radar Bomb Scoring Group Detachments C (11), K (5), and N (22)
 6004th Air Intelligence Service Squadron Detachments 1, 2, 3, and 5
 6146th Air Force Advisory Group
 6167th Air Base Group
 6405th Korea Air Material Unit
 6408th Far East Air Force (FEAF) Engineering & Services Squadron

Source for unit history:

Temporary tactical support wings
In July 1950 United States Department of Defense planners did not foresee that the Korean campaign would be of long duration. Consequently, the Fifth Air Force modified its command structure only to meet immediate needs. When the time came to move tactical air units to Korean airfields, Fifth Air Force did not deploy its permanent wings because they were heavily committed to the air defense of Japan. Instead, it utilized temporary air base squadrons and air base units to support tactical units in Korea. By August, the situation called for larger organizations with greater allotments of personnel and equipment, and Fifth Air Force set up five temporary tactical support wings to support the combat groups.

Formed to assist in the projection of force to Korea, these temporary wings provided facilities, administration, services, and operational control for assigned and attached combat units. The task was formidable, for the installations the wings controlled were usually "bare base" operations with no amenities and only marginally serviceable airfields.

Logistically, poor roads and rail lines, limited port facilities, and overextended airlift hampered the wings. Organizationally, they were without regular status, such as authorization for personnel and equipment or for promotions. Even with these handicaps and hardships, the tactical support wings performed valiantly. They worked hard to make combat airfields operable and to provide the support and control combat units needed. They struggled to keep pace with the dynamically changing battle lines, opening new bases and forward operating locations as needed.

Their success bought time for the Fifth Air Force to reorganize, and on 1 December 1950, regular wings replaced them.

 6002d Tactical Support WingOrganized effective 1 August 1950, at Taegu #1 AB (K-2), to support the 18th Fighter-Bomber Group. Forced to withdraw with its tactical units to Ashiya AB, Japan, on 8 August, it returned to Korea on 5 September and advanced to Pyongyang on 22 November. It retreated to Suwon AB (K-13) on 30 November, where it was replaced on 1 December 1950, by the 18th Fighter-Bomber Wing.
 6131st Tactical Support WingOrganized effective 8 August 1950, at Pohang AB (K-3), to support the 8th Fighter-Bomber Group, the wing moved to Suwon AB on 7 October and to Kimpo AB (K-14) on 28 October. On 25 November, it advanced to Pyongyang AB (K-23), where it was replaced by the 8th Fighter-Bomber Wing effective 1 December 1950.
 6133d Tactical Support WingThis wing organized 12 August 1950 at Iwakuni AB, Japan, to support the 3d Bombardment Group and was replaced by the 3d Bombardment Wing on 1 December.
 6149th Tactical Support WingOrganized 5 September 1950 at Taegu AB (K-2) to support the 49th Fighter-Bomber Group, this wing was replaced by the 49th Fighter-Bomber Wing effective 1 December.
 6150th Tactical Support WingOrganized 5 September 1950 at Tsuiki AB, Japan, to support the 35th Fighter-Interceptor Group, the wing moved to Pohang AB (K-3) on 5 October and to Yonpo AB (K-27) on 27 November, where it was replaced by the 35th Fighter-Interceptor Wing on 1 December.

Source for unit history:

Far East Air Force Korean airfields (K-sites)
During the Korean War, the large number of locations used for bases and the similarity of some geographical names prompted the Air Force to use alphanumeric identifiers for bases in addition to their proper designations. Under this system, each base in Korea received a "K number," simplifying positive identification when referring to the various bases.

These are the known bases that the U.S. Far East Air Forces operated during the Korean War. The place name spellings used are those found in Fifth Air Force general orders designating the K-Sites and other official Fifth Air Force documents.

 K-1 Pusan-West
 K-2 Taegu (Taegu #1)
 K-3 Pohang
 K-4 Sachon
 K-5 Taejon
 K-6 Pyongtaek
 K-7 Kwangju
 K-8 Kunsan
 K-9 Pusan-East
 K-10 Chinhae
 K-11 Urusan (Ulsan)
 K-12 Mangun
 K-13 Suwon
 K-14 Kimpo
 K-15 Mokpo
 K-16 Seoul
 K-17 Ongjin (Oshin)
 K-18 Kangnung (Koryo)
 K-19 Haeju (Kaishu)

 K-20 Sinmak
 K-21 Pyonggang
 K-22 Onjong-ni
 K-23 Pyongyang
 K-24 Pyongyang East
 K-25 Wonsan
 K-26 Sondok
 K-27 Yonpo
 K-28 Hamhung West
 K-29 Sinanju
 K-30 Sinuiju
 K-31 Kilchu (Kisshu)
 K-32 Oesichon-dong
 K-33 Hoemun (Kaibun)
 K-34 Chongjin (Seishin)
 K-35 Hoeryong (Kainsei)
 K-36 Kanggye
 K-37 Taegu No. 2

 K-38 Wonju AB
 K-39 Cheju-do No. 1
 K-40 Cheju-do No. 2
 K-41 Chungju
 K-42 Andong No. 2
 K-43 Kyongju
 K-44 Changhowon-ni
 K-45 Yoju
 K-46 Hoengsong
 K-47 Chunchon
 K-48 Iri
 K-49 Yangsu-ri
 K-50 Sokcho-ri
 K-51 Inje
 K-52 Yanggu
 K-53 Paengyong-do
 K-54 Cho-do
 K-55 Osan-ni
 K-57 Kwangju

References

 

 
Four Digit Wings of the United States Air Force
Korean War orders of battle
Military history of the United States during the Korean War